"Fly Away" is a song by Trinidadian-German musician Haddaway, released on May 29, 1995 as the lead single from his second album, The Drive (1995). It was written by Dee Dee Halligan, Richard W. Palmer-James and Junior Torello, and produced by Halligan and Torello. As with several of Haddaway's singles, another CD maxi was commercialized a few months after the first release. The song was a number-one hit in Finland and reached the Top 10 in Denmark, Israel, Italy, Lithuania, the Netherlands and Switzerland.

Chart performance
"Fly Away" went on becoming a notable hit on the charts across Europe, although it didn't reach the same level of success as his first singles. It peaked at number-one in Finland, and made it to the Top 10 also in Denmark, Italy, Lithuania, the Netherlands and Switzerland. Additionally, the single was a Top 20 hit in Austria, Belgium, Scotland, Sweden and the United Kingdom, as well as on the Eurochart Hot 100, where it reached number 17 in May 1995. On the UK Singles Chart, "Fly Away" reached its highest position as number 20 in its first week on the chart, on June 18, 1995. It also peaked at number 25 on the UK Dance Singles Chart. Outside Europe, "Fly Away" was very successful in Israel, reaching number four.

Critical reception
James Hamilton from British magazine Music Weeks RM Dance Update described "Fly Away" as a "unhurried crooned Euro galloper". 

Music video
There was produced a music video to promote the single. In the video, Haddaway appears in a cell wearing prison clothes. On the wall, there is a picture of a beach. He reads some lines in an old book on his bed. Then the camera appears flying over a desert landscape. A naked Haddaway is seen running through this landscape. He meets a white horse, smells some flowers and bathes in a waterfall. These dreamy scenes outdoors have a bluish tone and are mixed with the singer performing on his cell. Towards the end he comes out of the water, now with his clothes on. He keeps running through the landscape until he reaches a beach. The waves from the sea crashes against the shore. It is the beach from the picture on the wall seen earlier. As the video ends, Haddaway sings the last lines on his cell. The video was later published on YouTube in October 2012. As of September 2021, it has amassed more than 2,7 million views. 

Track listings
 CD single "Fly Away" (radio edit) — 4:04
 "Fly Away" (extended version) — 6:43

 CD maxi (14 April 1995) "Fly Away" (radio edit) — 4:04
 "Fly Away" (extended version) — 6:43
 "Fly Away" (hyper space mix) — 6:23
 "Fly Away" (maxi-flight-remix) — 5:25
 "Fly Away" (development corporation mix) — 6:50

 CD maxi - Remixes (12 June 1995)'
 "Fly Away" (Tinman's mile high mix) — 6:11
 "Fly Away" (sequential one club house remix) — 5:00
 "Fly Away" ("side by side" mix) — 6:08

Charts

Weekly charts

Year-end charts

References

1995 singles
1995 songs
Haddaway songs
Eurodance songs
House music songs
Number-one singles in Finland
Songs written by Richard Palmer-James
Songs written by Tony Hendrik